The 1996 Italian Grand Prix was a Formula One motor race held on 8 September 1996 at Monza. It was the fourteenth race of the 1996 Formula One World Championship.

The 53-lap race was won by Michael Schumacher, driving a Ferrari, after he started from third position. It was Schumacher's third victory of the season and the Ferrari team's first victory at Monza since 1988. Jean Alesi finished second in a Benetton-Renault, with Mika Häkkinen third in a McLaren-Mercedes. Drivers' Championship leader Damon Hill took pole position in his Williams-Renault and led until he made an error and spun off on lap 6, while his teammate and rival, Jacques Villeneuve, could only manage seventh.

Pre-race

To stop cars kerb-hopping at chicanes due to ongoing track modifications at the time of the race, tyre barriers were erected at each chicane. However this caused much controversy during the race, particularly in the opening laps, when two tyres ran free across the track in the path of other drivers. Damon Hill had a comfortable lead but would retire after colliding with the tyres.

Race

Jean Alesi made an excellent start from sixth to lead polesitter Damon Hill into the first corner, but ran wide and struck a tyre stack between the two Lesmos on the opening lap and lost the lead to Hill. Alesi was fortunate to escape with his own car undamaged, but his error caused a tyre to fall on the track and break the front wing of Mika Häkkinen's McLaren. Häkkinen was forced to pit for a new nose-cone, dropping him to seventeenth on the track.

Jacques Villeneuve sent a tyre spinning into David Coulthard's car at the Ascari chicane on the opening lap in a similar incident while trying to pass Michael Schumacher. Villeneuve was able to continue, although the collision with the tyre stack bent his suspension, which slowed his car and forced him to pit for a new set of tyres, a new nose-cone and a new steering wheel, dropping him to sixteenth place and putting him a lap behind. Coulthard was less fortunate, and immediately spun off with a broken suspension pushrod. Villeneuve apologised to Coulthard after the race. Whilst Gerhard Berger in the second Benetton had eventually pulled off before Parabolica when his gearbox failed on lap 5.

Hill was leading by four seconds on lap six when he hit the tyre barriers at the first chicane and retired with broken suspension. Eddie Irvine ran in third place for most of the first half of the race before having a similar accident. In all, eight cars made contact with the tyre barriers after running wide on the track, of which five (Hill, Heinz-Harald Frentzen, Olivier Panis, Ricardo Rosset and Irvine) retired.

Michael Schumacher also hit a tyre stack in the closing stages but continued without damage to his car and won the race. This was his first ever Italian Grand Prix victory after years of misfortunes including the collision with Hill the previous year.  Alesi, who re-took the lead following Hill's exit, finished second after losing out to Schumacher in the pit stops, and Häkkinen eventually recovered to third place thanks in part to Irvine's retirement. The Jordan-Peugeots of Martin Brundle and Rubens Barrichello finished in fourth and fifth positions respectively after a race-long battle for fourth place, Brundle overtaking at the Parabolica corner after Barrichello accidentally turned his engine off while trying to investigate a clutch problem, and had to get a push-start from the marshalls to continue. Pedro Diniz finished sixth ahead of Villeneuve, who only managed seventh place after Johnny Herbert's engine cut out on the final lap.

Classification

Qualifying

Race

Notes

 This was the last points-scoring race for the Ligier Formula 1 team.
 The tyre stacks were removed for the 1997 event.
 First time the Italian Grand Prix at Monza had been won by a German driver since Bernd Rosemeyer in 1936.
 This was the second and last time Williams would not score a point during the 1996 season, with the other one being the Monaco Grand Prix.

Championship standings after the race
Bold text indicates the World Champions.

Drivers' Championship standings

Constructors' Championship standings

References

Italian Grand Prix
Italian Grand Prix
Grand Prix
Italian Grand Prix